Ragnvald Thunestvedt (20 January 1926 – 2 May 1980) was a Danish racewalker who competed in the 1952 Summer Olympics.

References

1926 births
1980 deaths
Danish male racewalkers
Olympic athletes of Denmark
Athletes (track and field) at the 1952 Summer Olympics